Dafor (or Dafort, Daffort, in Arabic: الدافوع) is a town and  commune in southern Mauritania, located in the Ould Yengé department of the Guidimaka Region.

Geography 
The commune of Dafort is located in the region of Guidimaka, in the south of Mauritania. It is positioned to the west in the department of Ould Yengé and covers 276 km2.
It is bounded to the north by the commune of Bouanze, to the east by the commune of Tektaka, to the south by the commune of Bouly, to the west by the communes of Tachott and Ouldmbouni.

History 
Dafort was established as a commune by the order of October 20, 1987 establishing the communes of Mauritania.

Economy 
Agriculture is at the center of Dafort's economy, like almost all the municipalities in the region. But this economy is fragile because it encounters obstacles to its development, in particular the climatic conditions or the lack of means of the farmers. To deal with these obstacles, the state or various NGOs finance projects that improve the living conditions of the inhabitants.

For example, a project to set up a drinking water network was launched in 2021 in the village of Lefkarine.

References 

Communes of Mauritania